Morogoro Urban District is one of the six districts of the Morogoro Region of Tanzania. It contains the city Morogoro, capital of the Morogoro Region, and no villages. It is bordered to the east and south by the Morogoro Rural District and to the north and west by Mvomero District

, the population of the Morogoro Urban District was 315,866.

Administrative subdivisions

Constituencies
For parliamentary elections, Tanzania is divided into constituencies. As of the 2010 elections Morogoro Urban District had four constituencies:
 Morogoro-Kusini-Mashariki Constituency
 Morogoro Kusini Constituency
 Morogoro Mjini Constituency
 Mvomero Constituency

Divisions
Morogoro Urban District has six administrative division.

Wards
The Morogoro Urban District is administratively divided into twenty nine wards:

 Bigwa
 Boma (English Meaning: headquarters)
 Chamwino
 Kauzeni
 Kichangani
 Kihonda
 Kihonda Magorofani
 Kilakala (Luguru word meaning:Kilchoungua in SWAHILI)
 Kingo
 Kingolwira
 Kiwanja cha Ndege
 Luhungo
 Lukobe
 Mafiga
 Mafisa
 Magadu
 Mazimbu
 Mbuyuni
 Mindu
 Mji Kuu (English Meaning: center city)
 Mji Mpya (English Meaning: new city)
 Mkundi
 Mlimani (English Meaning: on the mountain)
 Mwembesongo
 Mzinga
 Sabasaba (English Meaning: 7/7 or July 7th)
 Sultan Area
 Tungi
 Uwanja wa Taifa

See also
Mazimbu Graves
Morogoro Rural District

Notes

Districts of Morogoro Region